Aruküla is a village in Hiiumaa Parish, Hiiu County in northwestern Estonia.

The village is first mentioned in 1688 (Arråküllaby). Historically the village was part of Suuremõisa Manor, and in 1795 part of Soonlepa Manor.

1977–1997 the village was part of Heltermaa village.

References
 

Villages in Hiiu County